Shiroky Log is a rural locality (a selo) and the administrative center of Shirokologsky Selsoviet of Seryshevsky District, Amur Oblast, Russia. The population was 288 as of 2018. There are 9 streets.

Geography 
Shiroky Log is located 69 km southeast of Seryshevo (the district's administrative centre) by road. Novy Byt is the nearest rural locality.

References 

Rural localities in Seryshevsky District